Brunswick Township, Pennsylvania may refer to the following:

 East Brunswick Township, Schuylkill County, Pennsylvania
 West Brunswick Township, Schuylkill County, Pennsylvania